Community library may refer to:

 Library branch
 Subscription library